The 2020–21 UCLA Bruins men's basketball team represented the University of California, Los Angeles during the 2020–21 NCAA Division I season. The Bruins were led by second-year head coach Mick Cronin and played their home games at Pauley Pavilion as members of the Pac-12 Conference. Tyger Campbell was named first-team all-conference, while Jaime Jaquez Jr. and Johnny Juzang were selected second-team All-Pac-12. Jaquez also earned Pac-12 All-Defensive team honors.

Prior to the season, five-star recruit Daishen Nix decommitted from his letter of intent with UCLA to sign instead with the NBA G League. Picked by the media to win the conference, the Bruins were 6–2 to start the season when senior Chris Smith suffered a torn anterior cruciate ligament in the win against Utah. Their best player, who was the Pac-12 Most Improved Player and a first-team All-Pac-12 selection the season prior, was ruled out for the season. The Bruins began Pac-12 conference play with a 5–0 record after beating rival Arizona on the road. This marked the fourth consecutive time UCLA had beaten Arizona in Tucson; it was also their fourth straight win against the Wildcats overall, making this the longest win streak by either team in the series since 2009. UCLA extended their conference record to 8–0 with a 61–57 road win against California. It was their best conference start since opening 9–0 in 1982–83, and the Bruins improved to 12–2 overall, including 7–0 in games decided by five points or less or which went into overtime. In their following game against Stanford, they suffered their first Pac-12 defeat after surrendering a buzzer-beating layup on an inbounds pass in a 73–72 overtime loss. 

Junior forward Jalen Hill, the team's top interior defender and among its top rebounders, left the team in early February for personal reasons. However, the Bruins added freshman forward Mac Etienne, who only enrolled in January after his prep season was cancelled due to the COVID-19 pandemic. UCLA ended the regular season losing three straight. They lost the regular season finale 64–63 to USC, who made a game-winning three-point field goal with 1.4 seconds left in the game. The Bruins led by 11 at halftime and were up by eight with five minutes remaining. The loss ended their 18-game home winning streak and extended the Trojans' winning streak in their crosstown rivalry to four. UCLA played the game without their leading scorer, Juzang, who sprained his ankle. The Bruins ended with a 13–6 conference record to earn the No. 4 seed in the Pac-12 tournament. In their tourney opener in the quarterfinals, they lost 83–79 in overtime to Oregon State after leading by as many as 16 in the first half and holding a 10-point advantage at halftime. It was their fourth consecutive loss after blowing a second-half lead. Juzang returned from his injury and scored 12 points. 

UCLA was selected for the NCAA tournament, opening in the First Four against Michigan State. In a reversal, the Bruins trailed by as many as 14 in the first half and 11 at halftime before rallying to win 86–80 in overtime. Jaquez finished with a career-high 27 points in UCLA's first NCAA tournament win since 2017. This was the most-watched First Four game in tournament history, averaging 3 million viewers. They defeated BYU to advance to the second round, joining fellow Pac-12 schools Colorado, Oregon, USC, and Oregon State—the Bruins' opponents in their four consecutive losses before the tournament. After winning against Abilene Christian, UCLA became the fifth First Four team to advance to the second weekend and Sweet 16. Following their overtime win against No. 2 seed Alabama and a 51–49 triumph over No. 1 seed Michigan in the East Regional Final, the Bruins became the second First Four team to advance to the Final Four, their first national semifinal since 2008.

In the Final Four, UCLA faced the top-ranked team in the country in Gonzaga, who were seeking to become the first undefeated national champion since Indiana in 1976. UCLA was a 14-point underdog, the largest Final Four point spread since the tournament expanded to 64 teams in 1985. The Bulldogs had been dominant all year, winning all but one of their 30 games by double digits, including their last 27 straight. The game was close throughout and featured 19 lead changes and 15 ties. The Bruins lost 93–90 in overtime after the Bulldogs' Jalen Suggs made a  three-point bank shot as time expired. UCLA was the first opponent to hold a second-half lead against Gonzaga in the Bulldogs' first five games of the tournament. The game was the second most-watched tournament game of the season, behind the championship game, with 14.94 million viewers and a 7.6 TV rating.

Previous season

UCLA finished the season with a 19–12 record. After starting slowly at 8–9, they went on an 11–3 streak and finished second in the Pac-12 at 12–6 in conference play. Cronin was named the Pac-12 Coach of the Year, while junior Chris Smith earned first-team All-Pac-12 honors and was voted the Pac-12 Most Improved Player. Due to the coronavirus pandemic, the Pac-12 tournament was canceled before the Bruins' first scheduled game in the quarterfinals, and the NCAA tournament was called off as well.

Off-season

Departures

Incoming Transfers

2020 recruiting class

Roster

Schedule and results

|-
!colspan=12 style=| Regular season

|-

|-
!colspan=12 style=|  Pac-12 Tournament

|-
!colspan=12 style=|  NCAA Tournament

|-

Rankings

Honors

Preseason award watchlists
 Chris Smith, Naismith Trophy, John R. Wooden Award, Julius Erving Award

Pac-12 Player of the Week
 February 15, 2021 – Johnny Juzang

Postseason awards
All-Pac-12 Team
Tyger Campbell, First team
Jaime Jaquez Jr., Second team 
Johnny Juzang, Second team  
Pac-12 All-Defensive Team
Jaime Jaquez Jr.

 NCAA East Region All-Tournament Team
 Tyger Campbell
 Jaime Jaquez Jr.
 Johnny Juzang, MOP

Final Four All-Tournament Team
 Johnny Juzang

 NCAA Elite 90 Academic Recognition Award
 Russell Stong

NCAA Tournament Statistics

Notes

References

External links
2020–21 UCLA Bruins Roster and Stats at Sports-Reference.com

UCLA Bruins men's basketball seasons
UCLA
UCLA Bruins basketball, men
UCLA Bruins basketball, men
UCLA Bruins basketball, men
UCLA Bruins basketball, men
UCLA
NCAA Division I men's basketball tournament Final Four seasons